Changa may refer to:

Changa (restaurant), a restaurant in Istanbul, Turkey
Changa, Anand, a village in Gujarat, India
Changa, Leh, a village in Jammu and Kashmir, India 
Changa, Pakistan, a town in Pakistan
Changa tuki a life-style including clothing, music and dance originated in Venezuela
ChaNGa, a code to perform collisionless N-body simulations
John Harrison Clark (c. 1860–1927), also called Changa-Changa, a settler of today's Zambia
Changdev Maharaj, an Indian mystic
Changa (drug), a smokable form of ayahuasca, containing DMT
Changa (album), a 2017 album by electronic trio Pnau
"Changa" (song), the title track
Chance Bateman (born 1981), AFL footballer nicknamed "Changa"
Ricardo Álvarez (Mexican footballer), Mexican First Division player, nicknamed "La Changa"
Changa (cicada), a genus of cicadas
Changaa, a distilled Kenyan alcoholic beverage (also spelled changa)